is a former Japanese football player.

Playing career
Onishi was born in Hokkaido on July 5, 1977. After graduating from Aichi Gakuin University, he joined J1 League club Yokohama F. Marinos in 2000. However he could not play at all in the match. In 2001, he moved to J2 League club Albirex Niigata. Although he played many matches as substitute forward until May, he could hardly play in the match from June. He retired end of 2001 season.

Club statistics

References

External links

1977 births
Living people
Aichi Gakuin University alumni
Association football people from Hokkaido
Japanese footballers
J1 League players
J2 League players
Yokohama F. Marinos players
Albirex Niigata players
Association football forwards